Aviva, My Love is a 2006 Israeli drama film directed by Shemi Zarhin.

Cast 
 Asi Levi – Aviva Cohen
  – Anita
 Levana Finkelstein – Violette
  – Moni Cohen
 Sasson Gabai – Oded Zar

Soundtrack 

In March 2020 Helicon Music released the film's soundtrack, which includes new remixes and tracks that were not included in the original release. The theme song "My Spring Shall Come" ("האביב שלי יגיע") was performed by Miri Mesika, and it appears in two different versions.
The soundtrack features the following talents:

 Limor Oved – Vocalization
 Yankale Segal – Oud
 Nitzan Hen Razel – Violin
 Oren Fried – Percussions
 Jonathan Bar Giora – Piano and keyboards
Shemi Zarhin – Synth qanun and voices

As the film was released in 2006 a special mix was released to the radio, in which, in addition to the original players, also feature Dudu Tassa on the guitar, Yaniv Teichman on the Oud and the Bağlama, Asher Pedi on the drums and Uri Zach on the keyboards.

References

External links 
"Aviva, My Love" - The full film is available on VOD on the website for the Israel Film Archive - Jerusalem Cinematheque

Original Soundtrack

2006 drama films
2006 films
Israeli drama films